Citadel 2 is a BBC Micro game developed by Symo for Superior Software. The sequel to Citadel, it is a platform game with puzzle solving elements. Like the original, the game's plot involves finding five gems hidden in various locations in a large fort, together with areas outside it (including mines, three trees, a lodge and a floating sky castle) and destroying them in a teleporter hidden at the bottom of a well. The game was released in 1993 on the Play It Again Sam (PIAS) 18 compilation, which also included the games Nevryon, Holed Out, and E-Type.

To win the game, the player must achieve a score of 100% by solving the various puzzles. Anyone completing the game without cheating was issued a signed congratulatory certificate by quoting the completion message.

Gameplay

Citadel 2 has a number of distinctive features. Unlike many other platform games, the player is not automatically killed if they come into contact with monsters or other hazards; instead the player is allocated a set amount of energy, measured by a number, which is depleted through contact, which can be replenished by collecting scrolls marked with a plus sign. In addition scrolls marked with a minus sign are present which will drain the player of half their health. If the player continuously loses too much energy in a room, the screen turns red and the player is transported back to where they entered the room. This prevents players from passing through a room simply by walking through enemies and taking the damage.

Most enemies cannot be destroyed, only avoided. The exceptions to this is a homing bee which must be destroyed using a smoker, and eight immobile guards which must be shot with a pistol. The pistol only has 16 shots so the player had to be accurate.

In addition to the gems, various other items are located throughout the game which can be collected and used to solve puzzles in order to obtain the gems. These include sixteen coloured keys which open doors of the same colour, giving access to other areas of the game; an oxygen tank which whilst carried allows the player to breathe underwater; barrels which can be jumped on to reach high areas ordinarily out of reach, and many others. Springs can be used go gain access to high up areas. The game features an apple object which generates reverse gravity when placed in special locations and is required to access certain areas.

The player is limited to carrying two items at any one time and a certain combination of objects in their inventory is often needed to solve particular problems. For example, an oil can is needed to open the drawbridge near the starting screen. As a tribute to the game Atic Atac, a two-part key is required to get past the wall blocking access to the teleporter. Objects are found on special bases which limits where the player can pick up and drop them. The game feature two taps which have to be placed on rare vertical bases.

All of the items scattered throughout the game are needed to complete it, with the exception of the beaker which was originally meant to be filled with water to destroy fires or with acid (in the pool above the Pit room) to temporarily destroy any creature. However memory limitations meant that this feature was cut although the beaker remained.

Placing a barrel on the base in the Altar screen allowed the player to jump right onto the rope and climb up to a secret screen titled wer. This was meant to lead to a special set of screens for the BBC Master version which was never written. A black and white pixel appears, corrupting the energy bar. This still mystifies the game author to this day. A god mode cheat could be activated by typing the word clare while the game was loading; Clare was the programmer's girlfriend at the time.

Development
The original name of the game was The Fort, but was changed by the game publisher.. This can be seen with the naming of the various sections of the main game area.

PIAS 18 was in fact Superior Software's last release for the BBC Micro.

External links
Citadel 2 website by the programmer
Citadel 2 information on bbcmicro.co.uk

1993 video games
Platform games
Superior Software games
Video games developed in the United Kingdom
BBC Micro and Acorn Electron games
BBC Micro and Acorn Electron-only games
Single-player video games